Señorita México was the name of a national beauty pageant in Mexico, celebrated since 1952. After 2005, the pageant changed its name to "Miss Mexico". From 1952 to 1994, was the official pageant responsible for sending the country's representatives to the Miss Universe, Miss World, Miss International and other international pageants.

After the crowning of Lupita Jones, as Mexico's first Miss Universe, a dispute between Miss Jones and the pageant organizers over overdued prizes, led to a break of the longtime association between the pageant and the broadcast network Televisa. When the pageant moved to TV Azteca network, a competing pageant called "Nuestra Belleza México" was created, later directed by Miss Jones with the sponsorship of Televisa TV Network.

In 1994, Señorita México lost the bid to Nuestra Belleza México to be the official pageant for the Miss Universe pageant. Later Nuestra Belleza México also obtained the rights of sending Mexico's delegates to Miss World and Miss International.

However, the "Miss Mexico" pageant still sends delegates to other international pageants. The trade name Señorita Mexico was trademarked in the United States, by Venezuelan Entrepreneur Adan S. Perez CEO of The Miss Mexico Organization with headquarters in Las Vegas Nevada who produces The Señorita Mexico U.S. beauty pageant. He developed a franchise system in every state of The Union to bring girls from all over the United States to compete in the National beauty event, which takes place every year in Las Vegas. Adan Perez has been producing the national competition Señorita Mexico U.S in Las Vegas, since 2003.

Titleholders
Below are the names of the annual titleholders of Señorita México, listed in ascending order, the states they represented during their national crowning or assignment and their final placements in Miss Universe after their participation.

Color Key

State Tally
Anyone who follows the Olympic Games or other sporting events will be familiar with the concept of the Medal Table, which ranks countries based on their first (gold), second (silver) and third (bronze) place finishes. Below is a similar table of the top rankings for the Señorita Mexico pageant, but of the 32 Mexican states, based on all results from the first event in 1952 to the most recent competition.

See also 
 Nuestra Belleza México
 Miss Mexico Pageant
 Señorita México U.S.

References

Beauty pageants in Mexico
Mexican culture
Mexico
Mexico

hu:Miss Mexikó